Buddy Holly recorded under several names and with several different backing bands. The Crickets played on almost all of his singles in 1957 and 1958.

Holly recorded prolifically before his untimely death in a plane crash on February 3, 1959. He released three albums in his lifetime. Coral Records was able to release archival new albums and singles for 10 years after his death, but their technical quality was mixed, some being studio recordings and others home recordings.

Holly's records were promoted after his death and had a loyal following, especially in Europe. The demand for unissued recordings by Holly was so great that his producer, Norman Petty, resorted to overdubbing whatever he could find: alternate takes of studio recordings, originally rejected masters, "Crying, Waiting, Hoping" and the other five 1959 tracks (adding new surf-guitar arrangements), and even Holly's amateur demos from 1954 (in which the low-fidelity vocals are often muffled behind added orchestrations). The last new Holly album was Giant (featuring the single "Love Is Strange"), issued in 1969. Between the 1959–1960 overdubs produced by Jack Hansen (with vocal backings imitating the Crickets' sound), the 1960s overdubs produced by Petty, various alternate takes, and Holly's undubbed originals, multiple versions of the same songs are available. There are also many different versions of Holly's Greatest Hits as well as covers and compilation albums of his songs performed by various artists. Many singles and albums of his material have been released posthumously, beginning with "Peggy Sue Got Married" in July 1959 and the successful 6-disc collectors box set Not Fade Away: The Complete Studio Recordings, 50 years later in 2009.

Albums

Studio albums

Compilation albums

Singles 
 
 
1.Charted on the Bubbling Under Hot 100 Singles chart.

Billboard Year-End performances

Buddy Holly

The Crickets

References

External links
 
 

Discography
Rock music discographies
Discographies of American artists